This List of tallest buildings in Wichita ranks high-rises from a starting point of at least  tall, based on standard height measurement. This measurement includes architectural details (such as spires), but this does not include Radio masts and towers. Currently the tallest building in Wichita, Kansas is Epic Center at  completed in 1987.

Tallest buildings

References

Buildings and structures in Wichita, Kansas
Wichita
Tallest in Wichita
19. https://www.penumbrariverwalk.com/
20. https://www.ksn.com/news/local/private-group-announces-proposal-for-1-5-billion-riverfront-project/